Mlowa is an administrative ward in the Iringa Rural district of the Iringa Region of Tanzania. In 2016 the Tanzania National Bureau of Statistics report there were 9,923 people in the ward, from 9,483 in 2012.

Villages / vitongoji 
The ward has 3 villages and 19 vitongoji.

 Malizanga
 Ikonongo
 Majengo A
 Majengo B
 Malizanga
 Matalawe
 Mlowa
 Mtakuja
 Ndorobo A
 Ndorobo B
 Nyamahana
 Ipwasi
 Majengo
 Mbuyuni
 Mlambalasi
 Mtakuja
 Mafuluto
 Kibuduga
 Magoya
 Majengo
 Mseketule
 Muungano

References 

Wards of Iringa Region